Stanislav Kostov (born 2 October 1991) is a Bulgarian professional footballer who plays as a forward for Lokomotiv Sofia.

Club career

Pirin Blagoevgrad
Born in Blagoevgrad, Kostov began his career at Pirin 2001 as an important part of their youth team. In January 2010 he was scouted by Pirin Blagoevgrad. Kostov made his first-team debut in the 2010–11 season as a substitute against Sliven 2000 in a 2–1 league win on 7 August 2010. He netted his first goal, as he scored the winning strike in a 2–1 home victory over Lokomotiv Sofia on 11 September. In the game, he also assisted Boris Kondev for the first goal and won the Man of the Match award. On 25 September 2010, in a home match versus Minyor Pernik, Stanislav scored the only goal for Pirin in a 1–1 draw. On 16 October he assisted Boris Kondev for the opening goal in a match against Levski Sofia, but Pirin went on to lose the game 4–1.

CSKA Sofia
After a good first half of the season with Pirin, Kostov caught the eye of the major Bulgarian clubs CSKA Sofia and Levski Sofia. After a tough transfer battle for the youngster, Kostov finally decided to sign with CSKA. He made 21 appearances for CSKA, scoring 3 goals.

Botev Plovdiv
On 22 June 2012, Botev Plovdiv signed Kostov on a season-long loan deal, with the option of making the move permanent. On 10 August, Botev exercised the option to buy 100% of Kostov's contract. He signed a two-year contract. The following day, Kostov made his debut in a 3–0 win over Slavia Sofia, coming on as a substitute for Vander. His first goals came on 24 November, in a 6–1 home win over FC Eurocollege in the Bulgarian Cup, scoring a hat-trick.

Beroe
In February 2014, Kostov signed a contract with Beroe Stara Zagora.

Pirin Blagoevgrad
Kostov returned to his home club in the season 2016/17. Scoring 16 goals in 51  games, he was the team's top striker and an unchangeable starter. During the winter break of the 2017-18 season he left for Levski Sofia.

Levski Sofia

After coming to Sofia, Kostov had a disappointing half a season in Levski. But during the second season of his spell there he started the season with 13 goals in just 14 appearances, the likes of which no other Bulgarian striker has done in the past 12 years since Georgi Ivanov, thus converting himself in a regular starter. Kostov scored 24 goals in 38 matches with Levski by the end of his second season and became the top scorer of the league.

International career
Kostov earned his first cap for Bulgaria on 16 November 2018, coming on as a late second half substitute for Simeon Slavchev in the 1:1 away draw with Cyprus in a UEFA Nations League match.

Career statistics

Honours

Club
CSKA Sofia
Bulgarian Cup: 2010–11
Bulgarian Supercup: 2011

Botev Plovdiv
Bulgarian Cup runner-up: 2013–14

Levski Sofia
Bulgarian Cup runner-up: 2017–18

Individual
First League top scorer: 2018–19

Personal life
Kostov became a father of a daughter in 2019.

References

External links
 
 
 Profile at Levskisofia.info

1991 births
Living people
Bulgarian footballers
Bulgaria under-21 international footballers
Bulgaria international footballers
First Professional Football League (Bulgaria) players
PFC Pirin Blagoevgrad players
PFC CSKA Sofia players
Botev Plovdiv players
PFC Beroe Stara Zagora players
OFC Pirin Blagoevgrad players
PFC Levski Sofia players
Olympiakos Nicosia players
Association football forwards
Sportspeople from Blagoevgrad